Labdia isomerista is a moth in the family Cosmopterigidae. It was described by John David Bradley in 1961. It is known from Guadalcanal in the Solomon Islands.

References

Arctiidae genus list at Butterflies and Moths of the World of the Natural History Museum

Labdia
Moths described in 1961